U.S. Route 241  may refer to:
U.S. Route 241 (Tennessee–Kentucky) in Tennessee and Kentucky
U.S. Route 241 (Alabama–Tennessee) in Alabama and Tennessee

41-2
2